The fourth season of the Indonesian reality singing competition The Voice Indonesia  premiered on August 29, 2019, on GTV. Armand Maulana, Titi DJ, Anindyo Baskoro and Vidi Aldiano all returned as coaches from the previous season, whereas Isyana Sarasvati debuted as a new coach, replacing Anggun. Ananda Omesh returned for his second season as host, alongside Gracia Indri, who replaced Astrid Tiar.

Vionita Veronika won the competition and became the first female to win the show, she also became the second stolen artist to win, following Mario G. Klau in season 2. Titi DJ became the first female coach to win the show and also for the first time the top 4 were all female.

Audition 
Auditions were held in 18 cities in Indonesia from April 5 till May 5, 2019. Otherwise, online auditions start from May 6 until May 26, 2019, via Metube.id.

Coaches and hosts 
In July 2019, it was announced that Armand Maulana, Titi DJ, Vidi Aldiano and Anindyo Baskoro who were judges in the previous season, would return. Anggun, also a coach in the previous season, did not return and was replaced by Isyana Sarasvati.

Ananda Omesh returned for his second season as host, while Gracia Indri replaced Astrid Tiar as co-host.

Teams 

Color Key

Blind Auditions 

Based on the U.S. version, the Block was featured within the Blind Auditions this season, which each coach can use once to prevent one of the other coaches from getting a contestant.

Color key

Episode 1 (August 29)

Episode 2 (August 30)

Episode 3 (September 5)

Episode 4 (September 6) 
Armand Maulana's daughter Naja Dewi auditioned as a surprise in this episode with the song "Gravity" and made all chairs turned. She "chose" Isyana.

Episode 5 (September 12)

Episode 6 (September 13)

Episode 7 (September 19)

Episode 8 (September 20)

Episode 9 (September 26)

The Knockouts

The Knockouts start from Friday, September 27, 2019. At this stage, the coaches can steal one losing artist from another coach.

Color key:

The Battles 

The Battles aired from Thursday, October 17, 2019. The Top 16 then moved to the Live Shows

Color key:

 Hizkia Gultom and Natasya Nabila paired for the battle, but Vidi & Nino can't decide to choose one, so they both then advanced to the Live Shows as a pair

The Comeback Stage 
For this season, the show added a brand new phase of competition called The Comeback Stage that was exclusive to Ruangguru. It was shown for the first time in the fifteenth season of the American version. After failing to turn a chair in the blind auditions or eliminated from knockout and battles.

Sing Off

The Battles

Round 1

Round 2

Live Shows 
Color key:

Week 1: Top 17 (October 24) 

Jordie Yose, the winner of the Comeback Stage had the choice to join any of the four coaches teams, and he decided to join Team Armand.

Week 2: Top 12 (October 31)

Week 3: Top 8 (November 7)

Week 4: Top 7 (November 14)

Week 5: Semifinals, Top 6 (November 21)

Week 6: Finale (November 28)

Elimination Charts

Overall
Color key
Artist's info

 

Result details

Team
Color key
Artist's info

 

Result details

References

External links
 Official website

2019 Indonesian television seasons
Season 4